Pangi Territory is an administrative area in Maniema Province of the Democratic Republic of the Congo. The  headquarters is the town of Pangi.

The Elila River flows through Pangi territory, entering the Lualaba River to the west.
The territory is divided into the Babene chiefdom and the Beia, Ikama, Wakabango and Wasongola sectors.
Most of the territory is inhabited by the Lega people, as are the adjoining Mwenga and Shabunda territories.
As of 1972 there were still a few Pygmies living among the Baziri tribe of Lega people.
Before independence the territory had 97,380 inhabitants of whom 35,518 were in urban and mining agglomerations.

References

Sources

Territories of Maniema Province

fr:Pangi
hu:Pangi